Just Another Love Story is a 2007 Danish romantic thriller film directed by Ole Bornedal.

Cast 
 Anders W. Berthelsen – Jonas
 Rebecka Hemse – Julia
 Nikolaj Lie Kaas – Sebastian
 Charlotte Fich – Mette
 Dejan Čukić – Frank
 Bent Mejding – Mr. Castlund
 Ewa Fröling – Mrs. Castlund

References

External links 
 
 Just Another Love Story Rotten Tomatoes

2007 drama films
2007 films
Danish drama films
Films directed by Ole Bornedal
2000s Danish-language films